Les Champeaux is a commune in the Orne department in north-western France. As of 2019, its population is 107.

See also
 Communes of the Orne department

References

Champeaux